The IZh-43 (ИЖ-43) is a Soviet and Russian double-barreled shotgun.

History 
IZh-43 was designed in early 1980s, and in October 1985, first prototypes of IZh-43 were presented at the hunting weapons exhibition in Irkutsk. In 1986, production of these guns began.

In 1986, IZh-43M shotgun was awarded the golden medal of the Leipzig Trade Fair.

Since July 1987 until February 1990, the price of one standard IZh-43 was 175 roubles. The price of one custom IZh-43 shotgun (with engravings, walnut stock and walnut fore-end) was up to 385 roubles.

Since 1988 Izhevsk Mechanical Plant began mass production of IZh-43 and IZh-43E.

In January 2004, a contract was signed between the Remington Arms company and the Izhevsk Mechanical Plant. Russian firearms was bought by Remington and sold in USA (IZh-43 was sold as Remington Spartan 220 and IZh-43-1S was sold as Remington Spartan 210).

In September 2008, all Izhevsk Mechanical Plant firearms were renamed and IZh-43 got the name MP-43 (Mechanical Plant-43)

Design 
IZh-43 is a side by side smoothbore shotgun. The barrels have chokes at the muzzle end.

It has a walnut, birch or beech stock and fore-end, although custom aftermarket variants are known.
It has chrome plated bores made of ar50 steel

Variants 
 IZh-43 (ИЖ-43) - first model, it is a hammerless shotgun, which design is based on IZh-58MA model
 IZh-43E (ИЖ-43Е) - second model, it is a version of standard IZh-43 with ejector
 IZh-43M (ИЖ-43М) - third model
 IZh-43EM (ИЖ-43ЕМ)
 IZh-43-1S (ИЖ-43-1С)
 IZh-43E1SM (ИЖ-43Е1СМ)
 IZh-43KN (ИЖ-43КН)

Users 

 
  - is allowed as civilian hunting weapon
  - is allowed as civilian hunting weapon
  - is allowed as civilian hunting weapon
  - is allowed as civilian hunting weapon

References

Sources 
 Ижевское оружие. Том 1. Ижевские ружья / Н. Л. Изметинский, Л. Е. Михайлов. - Ижевск, издательство Удмуртского университета, 1995. - 247 стр. : ил.
 Assembly and disassembly of the Baikal Bounty Hunter // "American GunSmith" volume XIV Number 8, August 1999 page 3 [IZh-43]

Double-barreled shotguns of the Soviet Union
Double-barreled shotguns of Russia
Izhevsk Mechanical Plant products
Weapons and ammunition introduced in 1985